James Young (May 11, 1800 – February 9, 1878) was an American politician. He was the Lieutenant Governor of Missouri from 1844 to 1848. He also served in the Tennessee House of Representatives from 1831 to 1833, in the Missouri House of Representatives 1836 to 1838, and in the Missouri Senate from 1840 to 1844.

He died at his home near Lexington, Missouri on February 9, 1878.

References

1800 births
1878 deaths
Members of the Tennessee House of Representatives
Democratic Party members of the Missouri House of Representatives
Democratic Party Missouri state senators
Lieutenant Governors of Missouri
19th-century American politicians